Marzy Koti Teyebi (also Romanized as Marzy Kotī Ţeyebī) is a village in Babol Kenar Rural District, Babol Kenar District, Babol County, Mazandaran Province, Iran. At the 2006 census, its population was 42, in 11 families.

References 

Populated places in Babol County